Rhipiliaceae is a family of green algae in the order Bryopsidales.

References

 
Ulvophyceae families